Ghaath is a 2023 Indian Marathi-language thriller drama, film written and directed by Chhatrapal Ninawe in his debut feature and starring Jitendra Joshi, Milind Shinde, Janardan Kadam, Dhananjay Mandaokar and Suruchi Adarkar. The film set in India's jungles, occupied by Maoist rebels, and revolves around the tense interplay between guerrillas, civilians and the police.

It is nominated to compete for the Panorama Audience Award at the 73rd Berlin International Film Festival, where it had its world premiere on 18 February 2023. Chhatrapal Ninawe, the first feature director is also nominated for GWFF Best First Feature Award in the festival.

Cast
 Jitendra Joshi (Assistant Commissioner Police)
 Milind Shinde (Raghunath)
 Janardan Kadam as Perku
 Dhananjay Mandaokar as Falgun
 Suruchi Adarkar as Kusari
 Sangramsingh Thakur as Shiva

Production
In 2020, the film was selected for the National Film Development Corporation of India’s (NFDC) ‘Work-In-Progress (WIP) Lab’ and won the Prasad Lab DI and Qube Moviebuff Appreciation awards presented in January 2021. 

Initially produced by Jio Studios and Drishyam Films the film was completed in 2021. It was selected as one of the Panorama titles in 2021, but withdrawn by then producers Jio Studios due to some dispute with co-producer Drishyam Films. Written and directed by Chhatrapal Ninawe in his debut feature, the film is set in Maharashtra's Naxal-affected region. Based on the lives of tribal people, police and Naxalites, it is now jointly produced by Platoon One Films, Drishyam Films, PayTamasha, Lighthouse Innoventures and UA Kathachitra.

Release
The film was selected as one of the Panorama titles in 2021, but it was pulled by then producers Jio Studios due to some dispute with co-producer Drishyam Films. Now, Ghaath had its  premiere on 22 February 2023 as part of the 73rd Berlin International Film Festival, in Panorama. It is slated for summer 2023 release.

Reception
William Stottor of Loud and Clear rated the film 3.5 stars out of 5 and wrote, "Ninawe’s screenplay is generally well-structured, although it takes too much time for these characters to finally converge." Writing about the climax he stated, "it is executed in swift, unerring fashion."  Stottor then said, "This holds the film back from a true whiplash moment to compound the terror of war, but the underlying currents of despair and death still run strong." Lida Bach of movie break rated the film 6.5 stars out of 10 and wrote, "In pale light and desaturated colors, Chhatrapal Ninawe draws a triptych of unscrupulous depravity that, despite bloody accents, places more value on psychological precision than action." Concluding Bach said, "Subtle symbolism and twists used sparingly, but effectively, increase the smoldering tension of the crime thriller gem played with naturalistic sobriety."

Accolades

References

External links

 Ghaath at Platoon One Films 
 Ghaath at Berlinale

2023 films
Films set in Maharashtra
2020s Marathi-language films
2023 thriller drama films
Indian thriller drama films
2023 directorial debut films
Films about Naxalism
Fictional portrayals of police departments in India